Gregor Grahovac (born 24 April 2000) is a Slovenian athlete born in Ljubljana.

Biography
A member of the Mass Ljubljana athletic club, multiple national and cup champion, he was a Balkan youth champion in the 400-meter run. With a member relay, he won first place at the Balkan Indoor Championships in Istanbul, where they broke the national record and the record of the Balkan Championships in the 4 x 400 meters. In addition to this record, he also owns several records in several age categories. The biggest success is a bronze medal at the EYOF (European Youth Olympic Festival) in Georgia in the 400-meter run and a place in the finals of the U18 World Championships in Kenya in the 400-meter run, in which he qualified as the only European. In addition, he is a media technician and IAM student.

Personal best
 100 m -	10.91	+0.2	
 200 m - 	21.54	+0.3	
 200 m -	21.28 *	+2.4	
 300 m -	33.77	
 400 m -	46.71
 4x100 m -	40.54
 4x400 m -	3:08.56

Indoor personal best
 60 m -	7.02
 200 m -	21.78
 400 m -	47.46
 4x400 m -	3:12.19

International competitions

2015 EYOF (European Youth Olympic Festival), Tbilisi (GEO)
400 m (48.56) - final (3. place)
100-200-300-400 m (2:00.93) - 3. place
2015 5-boj CRO-CZE-HUN-SLO-SVK, Breclav (CZE)
300 m (34.96) - 2. place
4x300 m / mixed relay (2:33.70) - 2. place
2016 European Championship, Tbilisi (GEO)
400 m (49.74) - qualifications (20. place)
2016 BRIXIA, Bressanone (ITA)
400 m (48.77) - 1. place
4x100 m (42.82) - 3. place
2016 4-boj CZE-HUN-SLO-SVK, Brno (CZE)
200 m (21.28, +2.4) - 1. place
100-200-300-400 m (1:55.17) - 1. place
2017 IAAF World U18 Championships, Nairobi (KEN)
400 m (48.88) - final (8. place)
2017 European Team Championships - 2. league, Tel Aviv (ISR)
4x400 m (3:08.56) - 1. place
2017 European Championships, Grosseto (ITA)
4x400 m (3:16.90) - qualifications (11. place)
2017 * Balkan Athletics Championships, Istanbul (TUR)
400 m (48.51) - 1. place
2017 4-boj CZE-HUN-SLO-SVK /, Miškolc (HUN)
200 m (21.54, +0.3) - 3. place
100-200-300-400 m (1:55.05) - 2. place
2019 European Team Championships - 2. league, Varaždin (CRO)
4x100 m (40.54) - 5. place
2019 2019 European Athletics U20 Championships, Borås (SWE)
400 m (47.82) - qualifications (15. place)
4x400 m (3:16.81) - 2. place
2019 * Balkan Indoor Athletics Championships, Istanbul (TUR)
400 m (49.21) - 4. place
4x400 m (3:20.27) - 2. place
2020 Balkan Indoor Athletics Championships, Istanbul (TUR)
4x400 m (3:12.19) - 1. place)
2020 3-boj CRO-SLO-SRB, Novo mesto (SLO)
400 m (47.74) - 1. place
4x400 m (3:14.02) - 1. place)

Recognitions
Athlete of the Year in Pioneers (1. place) 2015
Athlete of the Year in Juniors (1. place) 2016
Athlete of the Year in Juniors (1. place) 2017

References

http://slovenska-atletika.si/kdo-bosta-letosnja-atlet-in-atletinja-leta

2000 births
Living people
Slovenian male sprinters
Sportspeople from Ljubljana